The European Parliament election of 2004 took place on 12–13 June 2004.

The Olive Tree was the most voted list in Piedmont with 29.0%, followed by Forza Italia (22.1%).

Results
Source: Ministry of the Interior

Elections in Piedmont
2004 elections in Italy
European Parliament elections in Italy
2004 European Parliament election